Eaglebridge International School (EBIS) is an international school in Zhenxing District, Dandong, China. It includes grades kindergarten through high school.

It was founded in Dandong by Adventists from the United States who wanted to attract K-12 international students. It opened in October 2012, at the same time as the New Yalu River Bridge was planned, a major bridge connecting Dandong and Sinuiju, North Korea. In 2016, the school had 200 students, including about 50 North Koreans, which was less than the original projection of 300 students. China - North Korean relations had deteriorated by that point, and the bridge's construction had not been completed.

Campus
Secondary and elementary students can board at the school; secondary students live in rooms with two or four other students, while elementary students live in house-like environments.

References

External links
 Eaglebridge International School

International schools in China
Schools in Liaoning
Dandong
2012 establishments in China
Educational institutions established in 2012
Boarding schools in China